Last American Hero is a studio album by American musician James Ferraro, released on November 10, 2008 by Taped Sounds. It was later repressed in March 2010 by Olde English Spelling Bee.

Background and style
Last American Hero was inspired by Ferraro's experiences of living in a "kind of insane gated community for senior citizens", where his grandparents resided in Florida. He recalled feeling like he was in a "weird science experiment of consumerism" in the community, which consisted of "large flat-screen TVs, and insane Ikea couches that you can't even sit on because they're too big", as well as Chrysler PT Cruisers. As Ferraro explained, "this infrastructure of gated communities and Wal-Marts and Targets, and these complexes of shopping – that was their entire world."

The album incorporates heavily phased, bluesy guitar playing and saturated synthesizers, delay and loop effects, and thin, compressed recording quality. The cover of the tape release shows two unidentified bikers standing next to a saguaro cactus. The Olde English Spelling Bee repress includes a different cover, a picture of a Best Buy storefront along with a superimposed image from the courtroom TV program Judge Judy.

Release and reception

Last American Hero was released on November 10, 2008 through Taped Sounds, before being reissued in March 2010 by Olde English Spelling Bee as an abridged vinyl release.

Writing for Fact, Kiran Sande called Last American Hero "a magnificent record" and wrote that "Ferraro's willingness to engage with the real banal, liminal ugliness of consumer life is undeniably interesting, and on this album at least, the music feels emboldened rather than burdened by it." Critic David Keenan called it "fantastic" and described it as "a series of meditations on American concepts of heroism and freedom as refracted via MTV, Hollywood and various black magic marketing strategies."

Track listing

Original cassette release

Vinyl edition

References

2010 albums
James Ferraro albums